Tom Terry (born March 30, 1969) is an American television meteorologist.  He grew to prominence during his television coverage and forecasting of Hurricane Charley's path through Orlando in 2004. Terry had recognized and forecast the storm's track three hours before the NHC.

Personal life
Terry is married and the father of two children.

References

External links 
 Tom Terry's WFTV Bio

1969 births
Living people
People from Fresno, California
American meteorologists
Television anchors from Orlando, Florida
Journalists from California